The Three Dancers (French: Les Trois Danseuses) is a painting by Spanish artist Pablo Picasso, painted in June 1925.  It is an oil on canvas and measures 84.8 in x 56 in (215.3 cm x 142.2 cm).

Description

The painting shows three dancers, the one on the right being barely visible. A macabre dance takes place, with the dancer on the left having her head bent at a near-impossible angle. The dancer on the right is usually interpreted as being Ramon Pichot, a friend of Picasso who died during the painting of Three Dancers. (Some critics believe it could well be Picasso's wife Olga Khokhlova.) The one on the left is claimed to be Pichot’s wife Germaine Gargallo with the one in the centre being Gargallo’s boyfriend Carlos Casagemas, also Picasso's friend. Casagemas shot himself after failing to shoot Gargallo, twenty-five years before Pichot’s death, and the loss of two of his best friends spurred Picasso to paint this chilling depiction of the love triangle.

Background

Picasso painted The Three Dancers in Paris after a trip to Monte Carlo with his wife, ballet dancer Olga Khokhlova. At this time, Picasso was attracted to André Breton's Surrealism movement. In 1926 the painting appeared in Breton's work Le surréalisme et la peinture (Surrealism and Painting). Others link The Three Dancers to Picasso's failing marriage to Khokhlova.

Its caption at the Tate Gallery gives some insight into the background of the painting:

It is owned by the Tate Gallery, London, having been purchased by it in 1965, and is currently on display as part of the Tate Modern's 'Poetry and Dream' exhibition.  The purchase was facilitated by Picasso's friendship with Roland Penrose who was a trustee of the Tate at that time.

Related works

Composer and ukulele player Ryan Choi's debut album Three Dancers was named after the painting.

References

Notes 
 Picasso called it Les Trois Danseuses (French) despite being a Spanish citizen, and the painting is occasionally called this, the original title (see ), as well as its English translation.  Picasso lived in France and French titles for his paintings were not uncommon (see Garçon à la pipe and Les Demoiselles d'Avignon, for instance).
 Three Dancers at Artchive
 Three Dancers at everything2.com
 The Guardians Arts Feature, 7 July 2001
 The Guardians Arts Feature, 7 July 2001
 Tate Gallery: The Three Dancers
 Tate Gallery: The Three Dancers
 web.org.uk - The Three Dancers

Paintings by Pablo Picasso
1925 paintings
Collection of the Tate galleries
Dance in art